The Duncan Gallery of Art is located at 421 North Woodland Boulevard, DeLand, Florida, in Sampson Hall on the Stetson University campus. It contains artworks primarily by student and southeast artists.

Footnotes

Gallery

Art museums and galleries in Florida
Tourist attractions in Volusia County, Florida
DeLand, Florida